Theni is a valley town situated in the Indian state of Tamil Nadu at the foothills of Western Ghats. It is the headquarters of the Theni district, located at a distance of 70km from Madurai. It is known for the large-scale trading of garlic, cotton, cardamom, grapes, bananas, mango and chilli. It hosts the second largest weekly market in Tamil Nadu and the fourth largest in South India.

See also 
 Theni Allinagaram
 India-based Neutrino Observatory

References 

Cities and towns in Theni district